Hannah Burkhill (born 22 July 2000) is an Australian synchronised (artistic) swimmer. Artistic Swimming made its Olympic debut in 1984 (named Synchronised Swimming) and is one of only two events that is female only at the Olympics. Teams perform a 3-minute technical routine of five technical elements and a 4-minute free routine that emphasises creativity and choreography.

Burkhill represented Australia at the 2020 Summer Olympics. The artistic swimming team consisting of Kiera Gazzard, Alessandra Ho, Kirsten Kinash, Rachel Presser, Emily Rogers, Amie Thompson, Carolyn Rayna Buckle and Burkhill were able to progress to the final, however, they finished ninth.

Early years 
Born in Brunei to English parents Burkhill grew up in Western Australia. She excelled in Artistic Swimming and was a member of the SupaNova Synchronised Swimming Club in Booragoon.  

In 2016, Burkhill qualified for the Australian Junior Synchronised Swimming Team and represented Australia in the 2016 Junior World Championships, held in Kazan, Russia. The team achieve a 17th placing in the Women's Team competition and 13th in the Women's Free Combination competition. She was named to the Australian Team in and helped Australia secure Olympic qualification in the Women's Free competition at the  2019 FINA World Championships. in Korea.

References

External links 
  Hannah Burkhill on instagram

2000 births
Living people
Australian synchronised swimmers
Olympic synchronised swimmers of Australia
Synchronized swimmers at the 2020 Summer Olympics
Bruneian emigrants to Australia
Australian people of English descent
Sportswomen from Western Australia
Sportspeople from Perth, Western Australia